Rising (also known as Rainbow Rising) is the second studio album by the British-American rock band Rainbow. It was released on 17 May 1976.

History
Band leader Ritchie Blackmore retained only singer Ronnie James Dio from the previous album line-up, and recruited drummer Cozy Powell, bassist Jimmy Bain and keyboard player Tony Carey to complete the new roster. Recorded in Munich in less than a month, the album was overseen by rock producer and engineer Martin Birch. The band was originally billed as Ritchie Blackmore's Rainbow in the US, but was titled simply Rainbow on this release. In 1996 Cozy Powell told Record Collector magazine that much of the album was recorded in one or two takes, with some subsequent overdubs, which explains why no alternate or demo versions exist, just the original or rough mixes.

The album showpiece, the 8-minute and 26 second track "Stargazer", features the Munich Philharmonic Orchestra, and originally had a keyboard intro as evidenced on the 2011 Deluxe Edition's "Rough Mix" version.

Few of the album tracks made it into the band's live set: "Stargazer" and "Do You Close Your Eyes", written prior to the inaugural US tour in late 1975, featured in all the 1975 and 1976 shows, while "A Light in the Black" was dropped early in the 1976 tour, although it was reintroduced into the set during the Japanese dates. "Starstruck" was played in shortened form, usually as part of "Man on the Silver Mountain".

Release
The original vinyl release was a gatefold sleeve, containing a photo of the band inside, with a generic Polydor inner sleeve. Rising peaked at number 48 on the Billboard Pop Albums chart. In the UK it peaked at number 11.

The first CD issue had a slightly different mix to that of the original LP, including a longer delay before the band entered after Carey's opening solo in "Tarot Woman", and a longer play-out on "Run with the Wolf". The track "Stargazer" had the vocals mixed without the delay, the extra synthesizer deleted and some of the phased sounds deleted. When remastered in 1999 the original vinyl mix was restored.

2011 Deluxe Edition
After several reschedulings, the deluxe version of the album was finally released in Japan on 5 April 2011 as a 3 SHM-CD (Super High Material CD) Deluxe Remastered Edition. This limited edition reissue was released in a cardboard gatefold sleeve (mini LP-style paper jacket), featuring the "high-fidelity" SHM-CD manufacturing process (compatible with standard CD players) and was part of a two-album Rainbow cardboard sleeve reissue series featuring Rainbow Rising and Down to Earth. Both feature the unique-to-Japan obi strip and an additional insert. The Deluxe Edition subsequently received wider release, and went Silver in 2013 in the UK.

Reception

According to AllMusic, Rising captured "Blackmore and Dio at the peak of their creative powers...(it) chronicled both the guitarist's neo-classical metal compositions at their most ambitious, and the singer's growing fixation with fantasy lyrical themes – a blueprint he would adopt for his entire career thereafter."

Musicians Rob Halford of Judas Priest and Snowy Shaw have paid tribute to the album in recent years, with Shaw describing it as "a masterpiece and pretty much a milestone" and saying that it "introduced a more Dungeons and Dragons type fantasy heavy rock to the masses."

In issue 4 of Kerrang! magazine (cover-dated October 1981), Rising was voted the greatest heavy metal album of all time. In 2017, it was ranked 48th at Rolling Stone's "100 Greatest Metal Albums of All Time".

Notable cover versions
 Italian power metal band Domine covered the song "Stargazer" and released it as a Japanese bonus track on their 2002 album Stormbringer Ruler.
 Chicago metal band Bible of the Devil covered the song "Starstruck" on a 2004 split EP with The Last Vegas.
 Dream Theater also covered the song "Stargazer" on the album Black Clouds & Silver Linings (2009).
 Faroese folk metal band Týr covered the song "Stargazer" as well on their album The Lay of Thrym (2011).
 The 2014 tribute album to Ronnie James Dio This Is Your Life featured covers from "Starstruck" by Motörhead and Biff Byford and a medley of the songs: "Stargazer", "Tarot Woman", "Kill the King" and "A Light in the Black" called "Ronnie Rising Medley" by Metallica.

Track listing

2011 Deluxe Edition

Personnel
Rainbow
Ronnie James Dio – lead vocals
Ritchie Blackmore – guitar
Tony Carey – keyboards
Jimmy Bain – bass
Cozy Powell – drums

Additional musicians
Munich Philharmonic Orchestra – strings, horn
Fritz Sonnleitner – concert master
Rainer Pietsch – conductor

Production
Produced and mixed by Martin Birch
Recorded at Musicland Studios, Munich, Germany, February 1976

Charts

Certifications

Accolades

References

1976 albums
Rainbow (rock band) albums
Polydor Records albums
Albums with cover art by Ken Kelly (artist)
Albums produced by Martin Birch